Strepsichlora is a genus of moths in the family Geometridae described by Warren in 1907.

Species
Strepsichlora acutilunata Warren, 1907
Strepsichlora acutilunata ssp. dissimilis Warren, 1912
Strepsichlora costipicta Warren, 1912
Strepsichlora inquinata Warren, 1903
Strepsichlora megaspila Warren, 1912
Strepsichlora nubifera Warren, 1912
Strepsichlora remissa Prout, 1916

References

Geometridae